Freilingen is an Ortsgemeinde – a community belonging to a Verbandsgemeinde – in the Westerwaldkreis in Rhineland-Palatinate, Germany. The community belongs to the Verbandsgemeinde of Selters, a kind of collective municipality.

Geography

Freilingen lies 7 km from Selters on the Westerwald Lake Plateau, a popular holiday and recreation area. The locality offers many hiking and cycling trails. The Freilinger Weiher (lake), the so-called Postweiher, is open to bathing in summer.

History
In 1034, Freilingen had its first documentary mention as Vriligoim. In 1972, in the course of municipal restructuring, the Verbandsgemeinde of Selters was founded.

Politics

The municipal council is made up of 12 council members, as well as the honorary and presiding mayor (Ortsbürgermeister), who were elected in a majority vote in a municipal election on 7 June 2009.

Economy and infrastructure

The community lies right on Bundesstraße 8 leading from Limburg an der Lahn to Siegburg. The nearest Autobahn interchange is Mogendorf on the A 3 (Cologne–Frankfurt). The nearest InterCityExpress stop is the railway station at Montabaur on the Cologne-Frankfurt high-speed rail line.

References

External links
 Freilingen
 Verbandsgemeinde Selters (Westerwald)

Municipalities in Rhineland-Palatinate
Westerwaldkreis